To levende og en død is a 1931 Norwegian novel written by Sigurd Christiansen. A post office worker, due for promotion, faces a crisis of conscience when his workplace is robbed.

Adaptations
The novel has been turned into feature films on three occasions: a 1937 Norwegian film To levende og en død was made, directed by Gyda Christensen and Tancred Ibsen, a 1947 Czech film A Dead Man Among the Living directed by Bořivoj Zeman and a 1961 British-Swedish film Two Living, One Dead directed by Anthony Asquith.

Bibliography
 Soila, Tytti & Söderbergh-Widding, Astrid & Iverson, Gunnar. Nordic National Cinemas. Routledge, 1998.

References

20th-century Norwegian novels
1931 novels
Norwegian novels adapted into films